Dana White's Contender Series, formerly named Dana White's Tuesday Night Contender Series, is an American mixed martial arts promotion. In May 2017, the UFC announced White would hold the competition weekly on UFC Fight Pass (It has since been moved to ESPN+). As with the earlier web series Looking for a Fight, the goal of the series is for White to scout talent for the UFC. Similar to The Ultimate Fighter none of the fighters involved will have existing UFC contracts. Licensed separately from the UFC with Dana White applying for a promoter's license, it was stated ahead of the license being approved that “this is not the UFC, this is not the UFC brand, but instead a promotion that will allow up and coming fighters the chance to showcase their talents in hopes that one day they may compete in the UFC."

The inaugural event took place on July 11, 2017. All events have been held at the UFC's home base of Las Vegas.

List of seasons

List of contract winners

References

Ultimate Fighting Championship television series